The 2005 Primera División de Chile season was both 77th and 78th season of top-flight football in Chile.

Torneo Apertura

The 2005 Torneo Apertura was the season's first tournament. Cobreloa was the defending champions.

Qualification stage

Group standings

Aggregate table

Repechaje

Playoffs

Finals

Top goalscorers

Torneo Clausura

The 2005 Torneo Clausura was the season's second tournament. Unión Española was the defending champion after beating Coquimbo Unido in the Torneo Apertura final.

Qualification stage

Group standings

Aggregate table

Repechaje

Playoffs

Season table

Promotion playoffs

Top goalscorers

References

External links
RSSSF Chile 2005

Apertura